Chetan Datar was a playwrighter based in India. His first play, Zulva (play), was based on Uttam Bandu Tupe's book Zulwa which was written about the Devadasi system. The play was well received and directed by Waman Kendre".

References

Indian male dramatists and playwrights